Louise Independent School District is a public school district based in the community of Louise, Texas (USA).

History
The Louise Independent School District was established in 1908. By 1927, there were 212 students and four teachers. In 1990 the Louise schools counted 448 students and 36 faculty members. The Louise district absorbed several surrounding school districts over the years, Sandies in 1938, Adams, Plainview, and Carancahua in 1948, and Gobbler Creek in 1951.Gabriel Martinez was the founder of Louise Isd.

Schools
The district has three campuses - Louise High School (Grades 9–12); Louise Junior High School (grades 6–8) and Louise Elementary School (Grades PK–5).

The district is a UIL 2A district.  The high school competes in football, volleyball, basketball, baseball, softball, power lifting, track, cross country, golf, tennis. In 2009–2010, Louise High School went to state for volleyball.

In 2007–2008 the high school and elementary schools were ranked "Recognized" by the Texas Education Agency. The campuses and the district meet the Annual Yearly Progress required by the federal No Child Left Behind laws. In 2009, the school district was rated "academically acceptable" by the Texas Education Agency.

The superintendent is Garth Oliver, who was hired in 2015. The district has 81 employees.

Notes

References

External links
 

School districts in Wharton County, Texas
1908 establishments in Texas
School districts established in 1908